Elena Antonova (born 22 April 1971) is a Kazak cross-country skier who has competed since 1994. Competing in five Winter Olympics, she earned her best finish of 11th in the 4 × 5 km relay at Salt Lake City in 2002 while earning her best individual finish of 21st in the 30 km event at Lillehammer eight years earlier.

Antonova's best finish at the FIS Nordic World Ski Championships was fourth in the 4 × 5 km relay at Val di Fiemme in 2003 while her best individual finish was 26th in the individual sprint at Oberstdorf two years later.

Her best World Cup finish was fifth twice, both in the 4 × 5 km relay in 2001, while her best individual finish was 27th in a sprint event in Germany in 2005.

Cross-country skiing results
All results are sourced from the International Ski Federation (FIS).

Olympic Games

World Championships

a.  Cancelled due to extremely cold weather.

World Cup

Season standings

References

External links

1971 births
Cross-country skiers at the 1994 Winter Olympics
Cross-country skiers at the 1998 Winter Olympics
Cross-country skiers at the 2002 Winter Olympics
Cross-country skiers at the 2006 Winter Olympics
Cross-country skiers at the 2010 Winter Olympics
Kazakhstani female cross-country skiers
Living people
Olympic cross-country skiers of Kazakhstan
Asian Games medalists in cross-country skiing
Cross-country skiers at the 1996 Asian Winter Games
Cross-country skiers at the 2003 Asian Winter Games
Cross-country skiers at the 2007 Asian Winter Games
Medalists at the 2003 Asian Winter Games
Medalists at the 2007 Asian Winter Games
Asian Games gold medalists for Kazakhstan
Asian Games bronze medalists for Kazakhstan
People from Oral, Kazakhstan